Paravitrea is a genus of small, air-breathing land snails, terrestrial pulmonate gastropod mollusks in the family Zonitidae, the true glass snails.

Species
Species within the genus Paravitrea include::
 Paravitrea clappi

References

External links
 ITIS info

 
Gastropod genera
Taxonomy articles created by Polbot